The 1964 Honduran Amateur League was the 17th and last edition of the Honduran Amateur League.  Club Deportivo Olimpia obtained its 6th national title.  The season ran from 19 April to 20 December 1964.

Regional champions

Known results

Second round
Played in two sub-groups of three teams each between the regional champions where the winners advanced to the Final.

Known results

Final
Played in a series of three games.

Olimpia's lineup

References

Liga Amateur de Honduras seasons
Honduras
1964 in Honduran sport